90 Days is a 1985 Canadian comedy film directed by Giles Walker and written by Walker and David Wilson. The film stars Sam Grana and Stefan Wodoslawsky as Alex and Blue, two unlucky-in-love guys who are trying to find new girlfriends. The film also stars Fernanda Tavares as Laura, a woman with a business proposition for Alex to become a sperm donor, and Christine Pak as Hyang-Sook, a Korean woman whom Blue is considering from a mail-order bride service.

The film was one of several "alternative dramas" produced by the National Film Board of Canada in the 1980s and early 1990s, which combined dramatic and documentary film techniques. The characters of Alex and Blue originated in the earlier film The Masculine Mystique, which used a docudrama format to explore various male perspectives on relationships with women.

The film received six Genie Award nominations at the 7th Genie Awards in 1986, for Best Picture, Best Director (Walker), Best Actress (Pak), Best Supporting Actor (Grana), Best Supporting Actress (Tavares) and Best Editing (David Wilson).

A sequel film, The Last Straw, was released in 1987.

References

External links

1985 films
Canadian sex comedy films
English-language Canadian films
Films shot in Montreal
Films directed by Giles Walker
National Film Board of Canada films
Canadian docufiction films
1980s sex comedy films
1985 comedy films
1980s English-language films
1980s Canadian films